Carpe Fulgur is a game-localization studio that concentrates on making independent Japanese games available to the English-language market. Carpe Fulgur consists of founders Andrew Dice and Robin Light-Williams.

History 
The following history is largely based on an interview Andrew Dice gave to Gamasutra.

Andrew Dice and Robin Light-Williams met through the Something Awful forums. Dice had been interested in English translations of Japanese games and following in the footsteps of Ted Woolsey in the translation of several Square Japanese titles. After attempting to gain employment at a localization company in California, Dice contacted Light-Williams and proposed the idea of forming their own company for performing localizations. Dice said he saw value in bringing Japanese titles to the West as "above all what the Western gaming audience likes is a unique experience", an opportunity afforded by the growing dōjin market in Japan.

After forming Carpe Fulgur, Dice and Light-Williams considered approaching Gust Corporation, offering their services to translate games from the Atelier series, but ultimately decided against the idea. Light-Williams suggested the idea of approaching dōjin soft developers, as while titles from major Japanese developers have often been localized in English, there had been no effort for doing the same with the dōjin market. Williams specifically suggested Recettear, which had favorable word-of-mouth in Japan, and whose developers, EasyGameStation, were eager to open the game to the Western market. Though there was some trepidation due to the distance between countries and between Dice and Light-Williams (who, at the time, lived on opposite sides of the United States), EasyGameStation agreed to work with Carpe Fulgur for the translation.
The company was formally registered in June 2010 just before the group's first release, Recettear.

References

External links 

Giant Bomb description
Recettear: An Item Shop´s Tale

Doujin video games
Video game companies of Japan